Simone Margareta Koot (born 12 November 1980 in Utrecht) is a water polo player of the Netherlands who represents the Dutch national team in international competitions.

Koot was part of the team that became 6th at the 2003 World Aquatics Championships in Barcelona. At the 2006 Women's European Water Polo Championship in Belgrade they finished in fifth place, followed by the 9th spot at the 2007 World Aquatics Championships in Melbourne. The Dutch team finished in fifth place at the 2008 Women's European Water Polo Championship in Málaga and they qualified for the 2008 Summer Olympics in Beijing. There they ended up winning the gold medal on 21 August, beating the United States 9-8 in the final.

See also
 Netherlands women's Olympic water polo team records and statistics
 List of Olympic champions in women's water polo
 List of Olympic medalists in water polo (women)
 List of World Aquatics Championships medalists in water polo

References

External links
 

1980 births
Living people
Sportspeople from Utrecht (city)
Dutch female water polo players
Water polo drivers
Water polo players at the 2008 Summer Olympics
Medalists at the 2008 Summer Olympics
Olympic gold medalists for the Netherlands in water polo
21st-century Dutch women